A generative adversarial network (GAN) is a class of machine learning frameworks designed by Ian Goodfellow and his colleagues in June 2014. Two neural networks contest with each other in the form of a zero-sum game, where one agent's gain is another agent's loss.

Given a training set, this technique learns to generate new data with the same statistics as the training set. For example, a GAN trained on photographs can generate new photographs that look at least superficially authentic to human observers, having many realistic characteristics. Though originally proposed as a form of generative model for unsupervised learning, GANs have also proved useful for semi-supervised learning, fully supervised learning, and reinforcement learning.

The core idea of a GAN is based on the "indirect" training through the discriminator, another neural network that can tell how "realistic" the input seems, which itself is also being updated dynamically. This means that the generator is not trained to minimize the distance to a specific image, but rather to fool the discriminator. This enables the model to learn in an unsupervised manner.

GANs are similar to mimicry in evolutionary biology, with an evolutionary arms race between both networks.

Definition

Mathematical 

The original GAN is defined as the following game:Each probability space  defines a GAN game.

There are 2 players: generator and discriminator.

The GAN game is a zero-sum game, with objective function
The generator aims to minimize the objective, and the discriminator aims to maximize the objective.The generator's task is to approach , that is, to match its own output distribution as closely as possible to the reference distribution. The discriminator's task is to output a value close to 1 when the input appears to be from the reference distribution, and to output a value close to 0 when the input looks like it came from the generator distribution.

In practice 
The generative network generates candidates while the discriminative network evaluates them. The contest operates in terms of data distributions. Typically, the generative network learns to map from a latent space to a data distribution of interest, while the discriminative network distinguishes candidates produced by the generator from the true data distribution. The generative network's training objective is to increase the error rate of the discriminative network (i.e., "fool" the discriminator network by producing novel candidates that the discriminator thinks are not synthesized (are part of the true data distribution)).

A known dataset serves as the initial training data for the discriminator. Training involves presenting it with samples from the training dataset until it achieves acceptable accuracy. The generator is trained based on whether it succeeds in fooling the discriminator. Typically, the generator is seeded with randomized input that is sampled from a predefined latent space (e.g. a multivariate normal distribution). Thereafter, candidates synthesized by the generator are evaluated by the discriminator. Independent backpropagation procedures are applied to both networks so that the generator produces better samples, while the discriminator becomes more skilled at flagging synthetic samples. When used for image generation, the generator is typically a deconvolutional neural network, and the discriminator is a convolutional neural network.

Relation to other statistical machine learning methods 
GANs are implicit generative models, which means that they do not explicitly model the likelihood function nor provide a means for finding the latent variable corresponding to a given sample, unlike alternatives such as flow-based generative model.

Compared to fully visible belief networks such as WaveNet and PixelRNN and autoregressive models in general, GANs can generate one complete sample in one pass, rather than multiple passes through the network.

Compared to Boltzmann machines and nonlinear ICA, there is no restriction on the type of function used by the network.

Since neural networks are universal approximators, GANs are asymptotically consistent. Variational autoencoders might be universal approximators, but it is not proven as of 2017.

Mathematical properties

Measure-theoretic considerations 
This section provides some of the mathematical theory behind these methods.

In modern probability theory based on measure theory, a probability space also needs to be equipped with a σ-algebra. As a result, a more rigorous definition of the GAN game would make the following changes:Each probability space  defines a GAN game.

The discriminator's strategy set is the set of Markov kernels , where  is the Borel σ-algebra on .Since issues of measurability never arise in practice, these will not concern us further.

Choice of the strategy set 

However, as shown below, the optimal discriminator strategy against any  is deterministic, so there is no loss of generality in restricting the discriminator's strategies to deterministic functions . In most applications,  is a deep neural network function.

As for the generator, while  could theoretically be any computable probability distribution, in practice, it is usually implemented as a pushforward: . That is, start with a random variable , where  is a probability distribution that is easy to compute (such as the uniform distribution, or the Gaussian distribution), then define a function .

Consequently, the generator's strategy is usually defined as just , leaving  implicit. In this formalism, the GAN game objective is

Generative reparametrization 
The GAN architecture has two main components. One is casting optimization into a game, of form , which is different from the usual kind of optimization, of form . The other is the decomposition of  into , which can be understood as a reparametrization trick.

To see its significance, one must compare GAN with previous methods for learning generative models, which were plagued with "intractable probabilistic computations that arise in maximum likelihood estimation and related strategies".

At the same time, Kingma and Welling and Rezende et al. developed the same idea of reparametrization into a general stochastic backpropagation method. Among its first applications was the variational autoencoder.

Move order and strategic equilibria 

In the original paper, as well as most subsequent papers, it is usually assumed that the generator moves first, and the discriminator moves second, thus giving the following minimax game:

If both the generator's and the discriminator's strategy sets are spanned by a finite number of strategies, then by the minimax theorem,that is, the move order does not matter.

However, since the strategy sets are both not finitely spanned, the minimax theorem does not apply, and the idea of an "equilibrium" becomes delicate. To wit, there are the following different concepts of equilibrium:

 Equilibrium when generator moves first, and discriminator moves second:
 Equilibrium when discriminator moves first, and generator moves second: 
 Nash equilibrium , which is stable under simultaneous move order:

For general games, these equilibria do not have to agree, or even to exist. For the original GAN game, these equilibria all exist, and are all equal. However, for more general GAN games, these do not necessarily exist, or agree.

Main theorems for GAN game 
The original GAN paper proved the following two theorems:

Interpretation: For any fixed generator strategy , the optimal discriminator keeps track of the likelihood ratio between the reference distribution and the generator distribution:where  is the logistic function.

Training and evaluating GAN

Training

Unstable convergence 
While the GAN game has a unique global equilibrium point when both the generator and discriminator have access to their entire strategy sets, the equilibrium is no longer guaranteed when they have a restricted strategy set.

Similarly, the discriminator has access only to functions of form , a function computed by a neural network with parameters . These restricted strategy sets take up a vanishingly small proportion of their entire strategy sets.

Further, even if an equilibrium still exists, it can only be found by searching in the high-dimensional space of all possible neural network functions. The standard strategy of using gradient descent to find the equilibrium often does not work for GAN, and often the game "collapses" into one of several failure modes. To improve the convergence stability, some training strategies start with an easier task, such as generating low-resolution images or simple images (one object with uniform background), and gradually increase the difficulty of the task during training. This essentially translates to applying a curriculum learning scheme.

Mode collapse 
GANs often suffer from mode collapse where they fail to generalize properly, missing entire modes from the input data. For example, a GAN trained on the MNIST dataset containing many samples of each digit might only generate pictures of digit 0. This was named in the first paper as the "Helvetica scenario".

One way this can happen is if the generator learns too fast compared to the discriminator. So for example, if during GAN training for generating MNIST dataset, for a few epochs, the discriminator somehow prefers the digit 0 slightly more than other digits, the generator may seize the opportunity to generate only digit 0, then be unable to escape the local minimum after the discriminator improves.

Some researchers perceive the root problem to be a weak discriminative network that fails to notice the pattern of omission, while others assign blame to a bad choice of objective function. Many solutions have been proposed, but it is still an open problem.

Even the state-of-the-art architecture, BigGAN (2019), could not avoid mode collapse. The authors resorted to "allowing collapse to occur at the later stages of training, by which time a model is sufficiently trained to achieve good results".

Two time-scale update rule 
The two time-scale update rule (TTUR) is proposed to make GAN convergence more stable by making the learning rate of the generator lower than that of the discriminator. The authors argued that the generator should move slower than the discriminator, so that it does not "drive the discriminator steadily into new regions without capturing its gathered information".

They proved that a general class of games that included the GAN game, when trained under TTUR, "converges under mild assumptions to a stationary local Nash equilibrium".

They also proposed using the Adam stochastic optimization to avoid mode collapse, as well as the Fréchet inception distance for evaluating GAN performances.

Vanishing gradient 
Conversely, if the discriminator learns too fast compared to the generator, then the discriminator could almost perfectly distinguish . In such case, the generator  could be stuck with a very high loss no matter which direction it changes its , meaning that the gradient  would be close to zero. In such case, the generator cannot learn, a case of the vanishing gradient problem.

Intuitively speaking, the discriminator is too good, and since the generator cannot take any small step (only small steps are considered in gradient descent) to improve its payoff, it does not even try.

One important method for solving this problem is the Wasserstein GAN.

Evaluation 
GANs are usually evaluated by Inception score (IS), which measures how varied the generator's outputs are (as classified by an image classifier, usually Inception-v3), or Fréchet inception distance (FID), which measures how similar the generator's outputs are to a reference set (as classified by a learned image featurizer, such as Inception-v3 without its final layer). Many papers that propose new GAN architectures for image generation report how their architectures break the state of the art on FID or IS.

The model is finetuned so that it can approximate . This finetuned model is then used to define .

Other evaluation methods are reviewed in.

Variants 
There is a veritable zoo of GAN variants. Some of the most prominent are as follows:

Conditional GAN 
Conditional GANs are similar to standard GANs except they allow the model to conditionally generate samples based on additional information. For example, if we want to generate a cat face given a dog picture, we could use a conditional GAN

The generator in a GAN game generates , a probability distribution on the probability space .

For example, for generating images that look like ImageNet, the generator should be able to generate a picture of cat when given the class label "cat".

In the original paper, the authors noted that GAN can be trivially extended to conditional GAN by providing the labels to both the generator and the discriminator.

Concretely, the conditional GAN game is just the GAN game with class labels provided:where  is a probability distribution over classes,  is the probability distribution of real images of class , and  the probability distribution of images generated by the generator when given class label .

In 2017, a conditional GAN learned to generate 1000 image classes of ImageNet.

GANs with alternative architectures 
The GAN game is a general framework and can be run with any reasonable parametrization of the generator  and discriminator . In the original paper, the authors demonstrated it using multilayer perceptron networks and convolutional neural networks. Many alternative architectures have been tried.

Deep convolutional GAN (DCGAN): For both generator and discriminator, uses only deep networks consisting entirely of convolution-deconvolution layers, that is, fully convolutional networks.

Self-attention GAN (SAGAN): Starts with the DCGAN, then adds residually-connected standard self-attention modules to the generator and discriminator.

Variational autoencoder GAN (VAEGAN): Uses a variational autoencoder (VAE) for the generator.

Transformer GAN (TransGAN): Uses the pure transformer architecture for both the generator and discriminator, entirely devoid of convolution-deconvolution layers.

Flow-GAN: Uses flow-based generative model for the generator, allowing efficient computation of the likelihood function.

GANs with alternative objectives 
Many GAN variants are merely obtained by changing the loss functions for the generator and discriminator.

Original GAN:

We recast the original GAN objective into a form more convenient for comparison:

Original GAN, non-saturating loss:

This objective for generator was recommended in the original paper for faster convergence.The effect of using this objective is analyzed in Section 2.2.2 of Arjovsky et al.

Original GAN, maximum likelihood:

where  is the logistic function. When the discriminator is optimal, the generator gradient is the same as in maximum likelihood estimation, even though GAN cannot perform maximum likelihood estimation itself.

Hinge loss GAN:Least squares GAN:where  are parameters to be chosen. The authors recommended .

Wasserstein GAN (WGAN) 

The Wasserstein GAN modifies the GAN game at two points:

 The discriminator's strategy set is the set of measurable functions of type  with bounded Lipschitz norm: , where  is a fixed positive constant.
 The objective is
One of its purposes is to solve the problem of mode collapse (see above). The authors claim "In no experiment did we see evidence of mode collapse for the WGAN algorithm".

GANs with more than 2 players

Adversarial autoencoder 
An adversarial autoencoder (AAE) is more autoencoder than GAN. The idea is to start with a plain autoencoder, but train a discriminator to discriminate the latent vectors from a reference distribution (often the normal distribution).

InfoGAN 
In conditional GAN, the generator receives both a noise vector  and a label , and produces an image . The discriminator receives image-label pairs , and computes .

When the training dataset is unlabeled, conditional GAN does not work directly.

Unfortunately,  is intractable in general, The key idea of InfoGAN is Variational Mutual Information Maximization: indirectly maximize it by maximizing a lower boundwhere  ranges over all Markov kernels of type .

The InfoGAN game is defined as follows:Three probability spaces define an InfoGAN game:

 , the space of reference images.
 , the fixed random noise generator.
 , the fixed random information generator.

There are 3 players in 2 teams: generator, Q, and discriminator. The generator and Q are on one team, and the discriminator on the other team.

The objective function iswhere  is the original GAN game objective, and 

Generator-Q team aims to minimize the objective, and discriminator aims to maximize it:

Bidirectional GAN (BiGAN) 
The standard GAN generator is a function of type , that is, it is a mapping from a latent space  to the image space . This can be understood as a "decoding" process, whereby every latent vector  is a code for an image , and the generator performs the decoding. This naturally leads to the idea of training another network that performs "encoding", creating an autoencoder out of the encoder-generator pair.

Already in the original paper, the authors noted that "Learned approximate inference can be performed by training an auxiliary network to predict  given ". The bidirectional GAN architecture performs exactly this.

The BiGAN is defined as follows: Two probability spaces define a BiGAN game:

, the space of reference images.
 , the latent space.

There are 3 players in 2 teams: generator, encoder, and discriminator. The generator and encoder are on one team, and the discriminator on the other team.

The generator's strategies are functions , and the encoder's strategies are functions . The discriminator's strategies are functions .

The objective function is

Applications of bidirectional models include semi-supervised learning, interpretable machine learning, and neural machine translation.

CycleGAN 
CycleGAN is an architecture for performing translations between two domains, such as between photos of horses and photos of zebras, or photos of night cities and photos of day cities.

The CycleGAN game is defined as follows:There are two probability spaces , corresponding to the two domains needed for translations fore-and-back.

There are 4 players in 2 teams: generators , and discriminators .

The objective function is

For example, to train a pix2pix model to turn a summer scenery photo to winter scenery photo and back, the dataset must contain pairs of the same place in summer and winter, shot at the same angle; cycleGAN would only need a set of summer scenery photos, and an unrelated set of winter scenery photos.

GANs with particularly large or small scales

BigGAN 
The BigGAN is essentially a self-attention GAN trained on a large scale (up to 80 million parameters) to generate large images of ImageNet (up to 512 x 512 resolution), with numerous engineering tricks to make it converge.

Invertible data augmentation 
When there is insufficient training data, the reference distribution  cannot be well-approximated by the empirical distribution given by the training dataset. In such cases, data augmentation can be applied, to allow training GAN on smaller datasets. Naïve data augmentation, however, brings its problems.

For example, if  is the distribution of images in ImageNet, and  samples identity-transform with probability 0.5, and horizontal-reflection with probability 0.5, then  is the distribution of images in ImageNet and horizontally-reflected ImageNet, combined.

The result of such training would be a generator that mimics . For example, it would generate images that look like they are randomly cropped, if the data augmentation uses random cropping.

The solution is to apply data augmentation to both generated and real images:The authors demonstrated high-quality generation using just 100-picture-large datasets.

The StyleGAN-2-ADA paper points out a further point on data augmentation: it must be invertible. Continue with the example of generating ImageNet pictures. They would have exactly the same expected loss, and so neither is preferred over the other.

The solution is to only use invertible data augmentation: instead of "randomly rotate the picture by 0, 90, 180, 270 degrees with equal probability", use "randomly rotate the picture by 90, 180, 270 degrees with 0.1 probability, and keep the picture as it is with 0.7 probability". This way, the generator is still rewarded  to keep images oriented the same way as un-augmented ImageNet pictures.

Abstractly, the effect of randomly sampling transformations  from the distribution  is to define a Markov kernel .
A data-augmentation method is defined to be invertible if its Markov kernel  satisfiesImmediately by definition, we see that composing multiple invertible data-augmentation methods results in yet another invertible method. Also by definition, if the data-augmentation method is invertible, then using it in a GAN game does not change the optimal strategy  for the generator, which is still .

There are two prototypical examples of invertible Markov kernels:

Discrete case: Invertible stochastic matrices, when  is finite.

More examples of invertible data augmentations are found in the paper.

SinGAN 
SinGAN pushes data augmentation to the limit, by using only a single image as training data and performing data augmentation on it. The GAN architecture is adapted to this training method by using a multi-scale pipeline.

The discriminator is decomposed into a pyramid as well.

StyleGAN series 

The StyleGAN family is a series of architectures published by Nvidia's research division.

Progressive GAN 
Progressive GAN is a method for training GAN for large-scale image generation stably, by growing a GAN generator from small to large scale in a pyramidal fashion.

During training, at first only  are used in a GAN game to generate 4x4 images. Then  are added to reach the second stage of GAN game, to generate 8x8 images, and so on, until we reach a GAN game to generate 1024x1024 images.

To avoid shock between stages of the GAN game, each new layer is "blended in" (Figure 2 of the paper). For example, this is how the second stage GAN game starts:

 Just before, the GAN game consists of the pair  generating and discriminating 4x4 images.
 Just after, the GAN game consists of the pair  generating and discriminating 8x8 images.

StyleGAN-1 

StyleGAN-1 is designed as a combination of Progressive GAN with neural style transfer.

The key architectural choice of StyleGAN-1 is a progressive growth mechanism, similar to Progressive GAN. Each generated image starts as a constant  array, and repeatedly passed through style blocks. Each style block applies a "style latent vector" via affine transform ("adaptive instance normalization"), similar to how neural style transfer uses Gramian matrix. It then adds noise, and normalize (subtract the mean, then divide by the variance).

At training time, usually only one style latent vector is used per image generated, but sometimes two ("mixing regularization") in order to encourage each style block to independently perform its stylization without expecting help from other style blocks (since they might receive an entirely different style latent vector).

After training, multiple style latent vectors can be fed into each style block. Those fed to the lower layers control the large-scale styles, and those fed to the higher layers control the fine-detail styles.

Style-mixing between two images  can be performed as well. First, run a gradient descent to find  such that . This is called "projecting an image back to style latent space". Multiple images can also be composed this way.

StyleGAN-2 
StyleGAN-2 improves upon StyleGAN-1, by using the style latent vector to transform the convolution layer's weights instead, thus solving the "blob" problem.

This was updated by the StyleGAN-2-ADA ("ADA" stands for "adaptive"), which uses invertible data augmentation as described above. It also tunes the amount of data augmentation applied by starting at zero, and gradually increasing it until an "overfitting heuristic" reaches a target level, thus the name "adaptive".

StyleGAN-3 
StyleGAN-3 improves upon StyleGAN-2 by solving the "texture sticking" problem, which can be seen in the official videos. They analyzed the problem by the Nyquist–Shannon sampling theorem, and argued that the layers in the generator learned to exploit the high-frequency signal in the pixels they operate upon.

To solve this, they proposed imposing strict lowpass filters between each generator's layers, so that the generator is forced to operate on the pixels in a way faithful to the continuous signals they represent, rather than operate on them as merely discrete signals. They further imposed rotational and translational invariance by using more signal filters. The resulting StyleGAN-3 is able to solve the texture sticking problem, as well as generating images that rotate and translate smoothly.

Applications
GAN applications have increased rapidly.

Fashion, art and advertising

GANs can be used to generate art; The Verge wrote in March 2019 that "The images created by GANs have become the defining look of contemporary AI art." GANs can also be used to inpaint photographs or create photos of imaginary fashion models, with no need to hire a model, photographer or makeup artist, or pay for a studio and transportation. GANs have also been used for virtual shadow generation.

Interactive Media 
In 2020, Artbreeder was used to create the main antagonist in the sequel to the psychological web horror series Ben Drowned. The author would later go on to praise GAN applications for their ability to help generate assets for independent artists who are short on budget and manpower.

Science
GANs can improve astronomical images and simulate gravitational lensing for dark matter research. They were used in 2019 to successfully model the distribution of dark matter in a particular direction in space and to predict the gravitational lensing that will occur.

GANs have been proposed as a fast and accurate way of modeling high energy jet formation and modeling showers through calorimeters of high-energy physics experiments. GANs have also been trained to accurately approximate bottlenecks in computationally expensive simulations of particle physics experiments. Applications in the context of present and proposed CERN experiments have demonstrated the potential of these methods for accelerating simulation and/or improving simulation fidelity.

Video games
In 2018, GANs reached the video game modding community, as a method of up-scaling low-resolution 2D textures in old video games by recreating them in 4k or higher resolutions via image training, and then down-sampling them to fit the game's native resolution (with results resembling the supersampling method of anti-aliasing). With proper training, GANs provide a clearer and sharper 2D texture image magnitudes higher in quality than the original, while fully retaining the original's level of details, colors, etc. Known examples of extensive GAN usage include Final Fantasy VIII, Final Fantasy IX, Resident Evil REmake HD Remaster, and Max Payne.

AI generated video 
Artificial intelligence art for video uses AI to generate video from text as Text-to-Video model

Audio synthesis

Concerns about malicious applications

Concerns have been raised about the potential use of GAN-based human image synthesis for sinister purposes, e.g., to produce fake, possibly incriminating, photographs and videos.
GANs can be used to generate unique, realistic profile photos of people who do not exist, in order to automate creation of fake social media profiles.

In 2019 the state of California considered and passed on October 3, 2019, the bill AB-602, which bans the use of human image synthesis technologies to make fake pornography without the consent of the people depicted, and bill AB-730, which prohibits distribution of manipulated videos of a political candidate within 60 days of an election. Both bills were authored by Assembly member Marc Berman and signed by Governor Gavin Newsom. The laws went into effect in 2020.

DARPA's Media Forensics program studies ways to counteract fake media, including fake media produced using GANs.

Transfer learning
State-of-art transfer learning research use GANs to enforce the alignment of the latent feature space, such as in deep reinforcement learning. This works by feeding the embeddings of the source and target task to the discriminator which tries to guess the context. The resulting loss is then (inversely) backpropagated through the encoder.

Miscellaneous applications
GAN can be used to detect glaucomatous images helping the early diagnosis which is essential to avoid partial or total loss
of vision.

GANs that produce photorealistic images can be used to visualize interior design, industrial design, shoes, bags, and clothing items or items for computer games' scenes. Such networks were reported to be used by Facebook.

GANs have been used to create forensic facial reconstructions of deceased historical figures.

GANs can reconstruct 3D models of objects from images, generate novel objects as 3D point clouds, and model patterns of motion in video.

GANs can be used to age face photographs to show how an individual's appearance might change with age.

GANs can also be used to inpaint missing features in maps, transfer map styles in cartography or augment street view imagery.

Relevance feedback on GANs can be used to generate images and replace image search systems.

A variation of the GANs is used in training a network to generate optimal control inputs to nonlinear dynamical systems. Where the discriminatory network is known as a critic that checks the optimality of the solution and the generative network is known as an Adaptive network that generates the optimal control. The critic and adaptive network train each other to approximate a nonlinear optimal control.

GANs have been used to visualize the effect that climate change will have on specific houses.

A GAN model called Speech2Face can reconstruct an image of a person's face after listening to their voice.

In 2016 GANs were used to generate new molecules for a variety of protein targets implicated in cancer, inflammation, and fibrosis. In 2019 GAN-generated molecules were validated experimentally all the way into mice.

Whereas the majority of GAN applications are in image processing, the work has also been done with time-series data. For example, recurrent GANs (R-GANs) have been used to generate energy data for machine learning.

History
The most direct inspiration for GANs was noise-contrastive estimation, which uses the same loss function as GANs and which Goodfellow studied during his PhD in 2010–2014.

Other people had similar ideas but did not develop them similarly. An idea involving adversarial networks was published in a 2010 blog post by Olli Niemitalo. This idea was never implemented and did not involve stochasticity in the generator and thus was not a generative model. It is now known as a conditional GAN or cGAN. An idea similar to GANs was used to model animal behavior by Li, Gauci and Gross in 2013.

Adversarial machine learning has other uses besides generative modeling and can be applied to models other than neural networks. In control theory, adversarial learning based on neural networks was used in 2006 to train robust controllers in a game theoretic sense, by alternating the iterations between a minimizer policy, the controller, and a maximizer policy, the disturbance.

In 2017, a GAN was used for image enhancement focusing on realistic textures rather than pixel-accuracy, producing a higher image quality at high magnification. In 2017, the first faces were generated. These were exhibited in February 2018 at the Grand Palais. Faces generated by StyleGAN in 2019 drew comparisons with Deepfakes.

Beginning in 2017, GAN technology began to make its presence felt in the fine arts arena with the appearance of a newly developed implementation which was said to have crossed the threshold of being able to generate unique and appealing abstract paintings, and thus dubbed a "CAN", for "creative adversarial network". A GAN system was used to create the 2018 painting Edmond de Belamy, which sold for US$432,500. An early 2019 article by members of the original CAN team discussed further progress with that system, and gave consideration as well to the overall prospects for an AI-enabled art.

In May 2019, researchers at Samsung demonstrated a GAN-based system that produces videos of a person speaking, given only a single photo of that person.

In August 2019, a large dataset consisting of 12,197 MIDI songs each with paired lyrics and melody alignment was created for neural melody generation from lyrics using conditional GAN-LSTM (refer to sources at GitHub AI Melody Generation from Lyrics).

In May 2020, Nvidia researchers taught an AI system (termed "GameGAN") to recreate the game of Pac-Man simply by watching it being played.

References

External links

 
 
 This Person Does Not Exist photorealistic images of people who do not exist, generated by StyleGAN
 This Cat Does Not Exist photorealistic images of cats who do not exist, generated by StyleGAN
 

Neural network architectures
Cognitive science
Unsupervised learning